Javad Daraei (Persian:جواد دارایی, born 1992) is an Iranian film director, screenwriter, and filmmaker of cinema and cinematography. He graduated from the University of Tehran.

He is known for directing the short films I don't like her (2016) and Limit (2017), and his feature film debut Metamorphosis in the Slaughterhouse (2021). Metamorphosis in the Slaughterhouse received two awards at the 2021 Bare Bones International Film Festival.

Movies

Full-length films 
 Metamorphosis in the Slaughterhouse (2021)

Short narrative films 
 I don't like her (2016)
 Limit (2017)

References

External links 

1992 births
Living people
Iranian filmmakers